Women in comics may refer to:
Female comics creators
List of female comics creators
Portrayal of women in American comics
Gender and webcomics